The 1956 South Africa rugby union tour of Australia and New Zealand, more commonly known in New Zealand as the 1956 Springboks tour was a series of rugby union matches played by South Africa in Australia and New Zealand. The Springboks won 21 matches of 29, drew 1, and lost 7. They played 6 Test matches, with two victories over Australia and one over New Zealand. The New Zealand leg of their trip was the primary focus of the tour—23 of their 29 matches were in New Zealand, which included a four Test match series against New Zealand.

Matches in Australia
Scores and results list South Africa's points tally first.

Matches in New Zealand
Scores and results list South Africa's points tally first.

Test Matches

Australia first Test

Australia second Test

New Zealand first Test

New Zealand second Test

New Zealand third Test

New Zealand fourth Test

Squad

Manager: D.H. Craven
Assistant Manager: D. de Villiers
Captain: S.S. Viviers No Caps (Orange Free State)
Vice-Captain: J. du Rand 15 Caps (Northern Transvaal)

External links
 Tour in detail
 New Zealand Rugby Museum Information

South Africa tour
South Africa tour
South Africa rugby
South Africa national rugby team tours of New Zealand
South Africa national rugby team tours of Australia
1956 in South African rugby union